Aubrey Schenck (August 26, 1908, New York City – April 14, 1999, Murrieta, California) was an American film producer from the 1940s through the 1970s.

Biography
The son of George Schenck, a Russian immigrant theatrical manager, and Mary Schenck, Schenck was a nephew of Joseph and Nicholas Schenck. Father to George Schenck and grandfather to Kirk Schenck. He graduated from Boys High School and Cornell University, and was a practicing attorney in New York City.

Among Schenck's clients was 20th Century Fox that led him to be a personal assistant to Spyros Skouras.  When Schenck submitted a script for a film, Schenck told Skouras he'd prefer to produce the film himself rather than be paid a fee.  The film, Shock! (1946) starring Vincent Price, was a moderate success and launched Schenck's career as a movie producer.

Later he worked with Eagle-Lion Films and independent productions. When Eagle-Lion was merged into United Artists, Schenck started his own production company Bel-Air Productions producing a variety of action films as second features for UA.  Other films made by Schenck include Robinson Crusoe on Mars (1964), Ambush Bay (1966) and Kill a Dragon (1967).

Partial filmography

 Shock (1946)
 Repeat Performance (1947)
 It's a Joke, Son! (1947)
 T-Men (1947)
 Mickey (1948)
 Red Stallion in the Rockies (1949)
 Port of New York (1949)
 Undercover Girl (1950)
 The Fat Man (1951)
 Shield for Murder (1954)
 Rebel in Town (1956) (executive producer)
 The Black Sleep (1956) (executive producer)
 The Girl in Black Stockings (1957)
 Untamed Youth (1957)
 Born Reckless (1958)
 Up Periscope (1959)
 Robinson Crusoe on Mars (1964)
 Ambush Bay (1966) (executive producer)
 Kill a Dragon (1967)
 More Dead Than Alive (1968)
 Impasse (1969)
 The Alpha Caper (1973)
 Daughters of Satan (1972)
 Superbeast (1972)

References

External links 

1908 births
1999 deaths
Film producers from New York (state)
20th-century American lawyers
Businesspeople from New York City
Boys High School (Brooklyn) alumni
Cornell University alumni
20th-century American businesspeople